The XII Mediterranean Games, commonly known as the 1993 Mediterranean Games, were the 12th Mediterranean Games. The Games were held in Languedoc-Roussillon, France, from 16 June to 27 June 1993, where 2,598 athletes (1,994 men and 604 women) from 19 countries participated. There were a total of 221 medal events from 25 different sports.

Participating nations
The following is a list of nations that participated in the 1993 Mediterranean Games:

Sports
Nineteen nations competed in 25 different sporting events.

Medal table

See also
 International Mediterranean Games Committee
 All results at gbrathletics website

 
M
Mediterranean Games
M
Multi-sport events in France
Sport in Occitania (administrative region)
Mediterranean Games by year
June 1993 sports events in Europe